Simosthenurus, also referred to as the short-faced kangaroo, is an extinct genus of megafaunal macropods that existed in Australia, specifically Tasmania, during the Pleistocene. Analysis of Simosthenurus fossils has contributed to the finding that there are three lineages of macropods: Sthenurinae, Macropodinae, and Lagostrophinae. The genus Simosthenurus was among the sthenurines.

The two most documented members of the genus are S. maddocki and S. occidentalis, though other species have also been discovered.

Palaeobiology 
 
Osteological information (predominantly cave floor surface finds) has yielded that Simosthenurus is part of the same family as that of modern kangaroos. However, modern kangaroos are plantigrade hoppers, using jumping as their means of locomotion, while Simosthenurus was a bipedal unguligrade, walking in a manner similar to that of hominids. Although members of Simosthenurus were no taller than most modern species of kangaroo, their robust bones, broad pelvis, long arms and short necks were unique adaptations to their browsing mode of feeding. They had single-toed hind feet had small hoof-like nails more typical of animals adapted to moving over relatively flat terrain. Simosthenurus is a highly distinct lineage of macropods, with no living descendants. However, it is possible that their closest living cousin is the banded hare-wallaby, which is now restricted to small isolated islands off the coast of Western Australia.

S. occidentalis 
S. occidentalis mtDNA sequences were obtained from fossils in Tasmanian caves; the fossils yielded radiocarbon dates between 46,000 and 50,000 years ago. The sequences obtained in this study were from fossils much older than any Australian fossils that previously yielded sequences.

S. occidentalis was a leaf-eating marsupial, about the size of a modern grey kangaroo, though far more robust, with adults estimated to be about 118 kg. The species has been suggested to have used a bipedal striding gait when moving slowly. This is unlike modern kangaroos, which use pentapedal motion, or 'punting', pushing off their tail and forelimbs and swinging their hindlimbs forward when moving slowly. It is thought that, by rearing up on their hind limbs and using their long arms and fingers, they could reach overhead to grasp high leaves and branches and pull them down to their mouth. They then would use their powerful jaws and striated teeth to grind the tough leaves.

S. maddocki 
An adult S. maddocki was smaller than S. occidentalis, weighing only 78 kg. Like some other species from the same time period, they were apparently highly selective feeders. Local records indicate that the species was mainly located in southeastern Australia. It is uncommon to find fossils of this rare species, especially when compared to other Sthenurines.

Extinction 

 
There are several proposed causes of the extinction of Simosthenurus. The two most popular hypotheses include human involvement and climate change.

Human impact 
One theory postulates that human impact caused it. There are fewer extinct megafaunal Tasmanian species compared to those of continental Australia. This is most likely due to humans arriving in mainland Australia first. The extinction of Simosthenurus may be attributable to human over-hunting or habitat alteration. However, there is no archaeological evidence for interactions with humans, and the overlap of habitation in Australia and Tasmania of both humans and Simothenurus species, if there was one, would have been relatively short.

Climate change 
Another theory is that climate change caused the extinction of this genus. The last glacial period, popularly known as the Ice Age, has been linked with a severe reduction in several megafaunal populations, including Simosthenurus.

References

Prehistoric macropods
Prehistoric mammals of Australia
Pleistocene marsupials
Prehistoric marsupial genera
Fossil taxa described in 1966